Tinggi Island is an island in Mersing District, Johor, Malaysia.

Name
The island was nicknamed the "General's Hat"  (將軍帽) by Chinese seamen hundreds of years ago.

Geography
The island is located about 20 nautical miles (37 km) southeast of Mersing Town, on the east coast of Johor mainland.

Geology
The island rises up to 600 meters above sea level at a peak named Mount Semundu. The interior of the island is mostly covered with secondary lowland Dipterocarp rainforest. It has fresh waters, fruits, rattan, timber and a sheltered harbour and coral reefs which abound with prolific marine life. It has a long coastline and white sandy beaches dotted with caves. The seas around it contain coral, fish and reef. The island mostly consists of pyroclastic rock with up to 5 mm diameter in size.

Demographics
This island has the highest residential population among the east coast Johor islands, with the latest tally estimated at 448 people, from three village settlements: Kampung Tanjung Balang, Kampung Pasir Panjang and Kampung Sebirah Besar.

Transportation
The island is accessible by ferry from Mersing Town with an approximately 30-minute journey.

See also
 List of islands of Malaysia

References

External links
 Malaysia Travel Guide: Tinggi Island

Islands of Johor
Mersing District